The Irish League in season 1962–63 comprised 12 teams, and Distillery won the championship.

League standings

Results

References
Northern Ireland - List of final tables (RSSSF)

NIFL Premiership seasons
1962–63 in Northern Ireland association football
Northern